This is a list of lighthouses in the Canary Islands. The Spanish archipelago lies to the west of Africa, in the Atlantic Ocean.

Lighthouses

Map

See also 
 List of lighthouses in Spain
 List of lighthouses in the Balearic Islands

References

External links 

 

Lists of lighthouses in Spain
Lighthouses